Fort Collins High School is located at 3400 Lambkin Way, Fort Collins, Colorado, United States. It is one of four public senior high schools in the Poudre School District. The school colors are purple and gold, and its mascot is a lambkin, a baby lamb. The school serves approximately 1,800 students and has a staff of about 130.

History

Fort Collins High School is 131 years old. Classes were originally held on the second floor of the old Franklin Grade School at the corner of West Mountain and Howes Street. Almost 40 students were in the first classes at the school. By 1903, the need for a new building was apparent. At this time, the high school was moved to a new building on Meldrum Street, where the present Lincoln Center stands. Additions were made to this building in 1915 and 1921. In 1924, a new building which currently stands at 1400 Remington Street was constructed. Classes were held in this building from 1925 to 1995. In 1953, a large gymnasium was built on the north side of the building. A science addition was added to the south end in the mid-1980s.

Due to increasing student numbers, a new Fort Collins High School was built at the corner of Horsetooth and Timberline Roads at 3400 Lambkin Way, and opened in the fall of 1995. The enrollment at Fort Collins High School during the 2015-16 school year was 1,621 students.
Approximately 30,000 students have graduated since the first class of 1893.

School culture
Each year, Fort Collins High School students host Spread the Love Week, which is designed to make each student feel included. During the 2015-16 school year, students dedicated the week to raising enough money to grant the wish of a local child with a terminal illness through the Make-a-Wish Foundation. To foster a community spirit, the school also offers service learning classes, including a special Give Next class, in which students practice philanthropy to local nonprofit organizations.

The school offers one of the top track and field programs in the state of Colorado, winning 24 state championships and three national championships since its inception in 1912.

Notable alumni

 Wayne Allard (1963) – U.S. Representative of Colorado's 4th congressional district from 1991 to 1997, and two-term United States Senator from 1997 to 2009
 JD Hammer (born 1994) – Major League Baseball pitcher for the Philadelphia Phillies
 Michele Carey – actress
 Dorothy Metcalf-Lindenburger (1993) – former American astronaut on the STS-131 mission, launched on 5 April 2010, after being selected as an Educator Mission Specialist in 2004
 John Paragon (1973) – American actor who rose from the Groundlings troupe and became known for roles on Seinfeld and as Jambi the Genie on Pee-Wee's Playhouse. 
 Ada-Rhodes Short (born 1991) – Trans activist, roboticist, and assistant professor at University of Nebraska Omaha

References

External links

Public high schools in Colorado
Education in Fort Collins, Colorado
Educational institutions established in 1890
Schools in Larimer County, Colorado
School buildings completed in 1995
1890 establishments in Colorado